The Handley Page HP.100 was a tendered submission to build a long-range, high-speed  reconnaissance aircraft for the Royal Air Force, able to overfly Soviet territory in the face of anti-aircraft defences, and to supply information for the V bomber force carrying nuclear weapons.

The operational requirement, OR.330, specified an unarmed radar-equipped aircraft capable of cruising in excess of Mach 2, able to reach Mach 3, and having a range of around 5,000 mi (8,050 km). Handley Page, Shorts, Vickers and Avro each supplied designs for consideration. In 1955, the contract was awarded to the Avro 730 and work on the HP.100 stopped with a partial mockup.

The high-speed reconnaissance project, including the Avro 730, was cancelled in 1957.

Specification
Handley Page's design had a delta wing with canard foreplanes, and was powered by 12 small turbojets in a fairing below the leading edge of the wing.

 Length: 185 ft (56.4 m)
 Wingspan: 59.3 ft (18.1 m)

See also

References

1950s British experimental aircraft
HP.100